Padur (or Padoor)  is a village in Palakkad District, Kerala. There is a temple of Sree Panickanar where a yearly festival called Padur Vela is celebrated, which is the curtain raiser for Vela-Poorams in Palakkad.

Location
Padur is a village in Palakkad District of Kerala State. It is a border village between Palakkad and Thrissur Districts. Padur comes under Kavassery Village II of Alathur revenue taluk. In about 5 km2 in area, and the population is nearly 5,000. Padur is situated 31 km from Palakkad district headquarters, 8 km from Alathur and 8 km from Pazhayannur.

Geography
Padur is surrounded by rivers on its 3 sides. The river Gayathri forms the northern boundary, and the river Mangalam to the southern. The rivers merge into the river Bharatapuzha, the largest river in Kerala, in the west of the village. Padur has thick greenery, including paddy fields, banana farms and coconut trees.

Etymology
The name Padur (Padoor:പാടൂര്) is derived from the usage : "The land (oor : ഊര്) of Palakkad King (പാലക്കാട്‌ രാജാവ്)". This is why, the 'Vela-Pooram' celebrations in Palakkad starts from Padur.

Temples
Padur Vela, usually celebrated on 23 or 24 February every year is the curtain raiser for Vela Poorams in Palakkad. The festival is celebrated as birthday of Lord Sree Panickanar, an incarnation of Lord Ayyappa. The culture, belief, and prosperity of this village is bound to Sree Panickanar. This temple is one of the rarest of its kind as the idol is formed on its own (swayam bhoo :സ്വയം ഭൂ). Apart from this there are around six more temples in the village. They are of Lord Shiva, Lord Krishna, Karthiayani Kovil — of Goddess Parvathi, Sree Kurumba Kaavu — of an incarnated Goddess known as the daughter of Lord Shiva, a couple of Mariamman Kavu — temples of a Hindu goddess, Venkatachalapathy Temple in East Village and the list goes on. There is a church and a mosque in the boundaries of the village.

Demography
The majority of people belong to the Hindu religion. However, there are people from other religions such as Christianity and Muslim.

Institutions
Padur has an Aided LP school which is in its 113th year of existence providing knowledge to about 5 generations. There is a primary health center and a veterinary hospital. Bharat Sanchar Nigam Limited (BSNL) has set up a telephone exchange in Padur. A branch post office is also present in the village. A public library and a number of sports clubs are also the assets of this small village. Blue Star Sports club has delivered many talented volleyball players to the state.

People 

Padur is famous for astrologers and there is a community of people who are professional astrologers. The astrologers are called Panickers and use Padur Panicker (Kalarikkal) in their names.

Irrespective of the religion, caste or colour, the people of Padur are very conservative and are closely knit together through traditions, culture, and relations. They believe that they are always looked after by Sree Panickanar, no matter which religion they belong to.

The main occupation of the people of Padur is agriculture — either as agriculturalist or as laborer. A few are working in government services. A countable number of people work in other states of India and abroad, in either public or private sectors. A few entrepreneurs also live here. There is a Mini Industrial Estate in Padur, where small scale industries such as plastic products, power looms, soap and brick manufacturing units are running, thus providing job opportunities to people in Padur and neighboring villages.

Educational institutions 

The village has a lower primary school which is located 0.5 km from Padur center.

Transportation 

Padur, being in the midway between Alathur and Pazhayannur state road, is well connected through road to different places in the region such as Palakkad, Alathur, Thrissur, Nemmara, and many more. Direct buses are available from Palakkad Municipal Bus Stand, Alathur New Bus Stand and Thrissur Saktan Bus Stand. Apart from this connecting buses are also available from Palakkad Junction Railway Station and Palakkad Town Bus Stand. The nearest railway stations from Padur are Palghat Junction, and Thrissur Junction. The nearest airports are Coimbatore and Cochin. Bus services are available from 5 am till 8.30 pm.

Festivals 

Padur Vela celebrated in the month of February every year brings in a lot of crowds to the place. The excitement of vela starts one month before and people clean and paint their houses. People from the Padur village who stay in other places also come to attend this festival. This festival features lot of fireworks, elephant processions, and other cultural events.

Apart from Padur Vela, some more festivals are celebrated every year like the Karthika Vilakku in West Village and Manadalavilakku and Brahmotsavam in East Village. There are two Mariamman Temples in Padur where Mariamman Vilakku is celebrated every year.

References

Villages in Palakkad district